Lady Raffles may refer to:

People
Olivia Mariamne Devenish, the first wife of Sir Stamford Raffles
Sophia Hull, the writer and the second wife of Sir Stamford Raffles

Ship
a ship from London in 1817, which Sir Stamford Raffles, his wife Sophia and thirty others traveled on board from Portsmouth, Hampshire, England to Bencoolen, Jakarta

Film
Lady Raffles (film)